"Nanniwan" is a revolutionary song written in 1943 with lyrics by communist playwright and poet He Jingzhi and music by Ma Ke. It was made popular by the Chinese Communist Party and continues to be one of the most recognisable songs in the People's Republic of China.

Nanniwan is a gorge about 90 km southeast of Yan'an, Shaanxi province. In response to economic blockades by the Imperial Japanese Army and Kuomintang in 1941, the Communists set up crops production committee with Ren Bishi as its head and began experimenting with small scale agricultural development as well as poppy production in a bid to become self-sufficient. The 359th brigade of the Eighth Route Army was deployed to Nanniwan to improve productivity. In 1943 Nanniwan was heralded a success, and a propagandist song was commissioned. The lyrics, written by He Jingzhi, were set to a traditional folk melody of northern Shaanxi.

The song rose during the last years of the Second Sino-Japanese War and continued to be popular after the Communist victory in 1949. It is the signature song of the important revolutionary singer Wang Kun, and Cui Jian, widely regarded as the "father of Chinese rock," created a rock version of the song in 1987. It experienced a revival during the mid-1990s along with other revolutionary songs, with the release of many re-adaptations in Guoyue compilations.

Cui Jian performance controversy 
Cui Jian was invited to perform for an annual official TV gala in 1987 where he sang a version of the song that was distinctly different. His version removed the final stanza that hails the achievements of the 359th Brigade, changing the tone of the song to sound more like a lament. The commander of the 359th Brigade, Wang Zhen, took offense and the performance cost Cui his job - he was banned from performing and forced to perform underground. Undeterred, Cui continued to perform Nanniwan at nearly every major performance of his following the ban.

Lyrics 

* This lyric, referring to Nanniwan as "Jiangnan", implies it is as prosperous as the extremely fertile area immediately south of the Yangtze.

References 

Songs about revolutions
1943 songs
Political party songs
Chinese patriotic songs
Cui Jian songs